Pelle Jensen is a German footballer who plays as a defender for TSG 1899 Hoffenheim II.

References

External links
 

Living people
1992 births
German footballers
Association football defenders
FC Hansa Rostock players
TSG 1899 Hoffenheim players
Bundesliga players
3. Liga players
Footballers from Hamburg